The National Assembly was the bicameral parliament of Czechoslovakia from 1920 to 1939, during the First and Second Republics. It consisted of a Chamber of Deputies with 300 members and a Senate with 150 members.

Leadership

Presidents of the Senate 
 1920 Cyril Horáček
 1920–1924 Karel Prášek
 1924–1926 Václav Donát
 1926 Václav Klofáč
 1926–1929 Mořic Hruban
 1929–1939 František Soukup

Presidents of the Chamber of Deputies 
 1920–1925 František Tomášek
 1925–1932 Jan Malypetr
 1932–1935 
 1935 Bohumír Bradáč
 1935–1939 Jan Malypetr

References

1920 establishments in Czechoslovakia
1939 disestablishments in Czechoslovakia
Parliaments of Czechoslovakia